Sandringham is a town on the Eastport Peninsula in Bonavista Bay North in the Canadian province of Newfoundland and Labrador, Canada. The town had a population of 205 in the Canada 2021 Census.

Demographics 

See also
 List of cities and towns in Newfoundland and Labrador

References 

Towns in Newfoundland and Labrador